Suriname competed in the Summer Olympic Games for the first time at the 1960 Summer Olympics in Rome, Italy.

Wim Esajas, the first athlete from Suriname to the Olympics, was entered in the 800 metres, but was told due to a scheduling  error that the heats were in the afternoon, so he rested in the morning. But when he arrived at the stadium the heats were over, and he returned home without having competed.

References
Official Olympic Reports

Nations at the 1960 Summer Olympics
1960
Olym